Pheidonocarpa is a genus of flowering plants belonging to the family Gesneriaceae.

Its native range is the Caribbean region.

Species
Species:
 Pheidonocarpa corymbosa (Sw.) L.E.Skog

References

Gesnerioideae
Gesneriaceae genera